Antonio José de Barros Carvalho e Mello Mourão (February 8, 1952 – June 6, 2016), known professionally as Tunga, was a Brazilian sculptor and performance artist. The Art Newspaper called him "One of Brazil's best-known contemporary artists." As early as he knew the Brazilian modernism he began his career in 1970 by making sculptures and drawings. In 1974 he completed a course in arquitecture and urbanism at the Universidade Santa Ursula.  In 2005, Tunga became the first contemporary artist to exhibit his work at the Louvre in the museum's history during an installation called "A la Lumiere des Deux Mondes" ("The Meeting of Two Worlds"). One of Tunga's favorite practices was drawing, and he made his first solo show in 1974 at Museu de Arte Moderna do Rio de Janeiro entirely dedicated to this medium.

Permanent exhibitions of museums such as the Guggenheim in Venice, and whole wings exclusively dedicated to his work at the Brazilian Inhotim Institute. Some private collections also display his works, such as the  V+R Sapoznik Art Collection.

Tunga was born in Palmares, Pernambuco, Brazil, in 1952. He died in Rio de Janeiro on June 6, 2016, at the age of 64 after battling cancer for several years.

Individual Exhibitions 
-1974 - Rio de Janeiro RJ - The Child Masturbation Museum, at the Rio de Janeiro Museum of Modern Art - MAM/RJ.

-1975 - Rio de Janeiro RJ - Individual, at the MAM/RJ.

-1976 - São Paulo SP - Tunga: drawings and objects, at Galeria Luisa Strina.

-1979 - Rio de Janeiro RJ - Pálpebras, at Centro Cultural Candido Mendes
-1980 - Rio de Janeiro RJ - Individual, at Espaço ABC.

-1981 - São Paulo SP - Individual, at Raquel Arnaud
-1982 - Rio de Janeiro Art Office RJ - Individual, at Candido Mendes Cultural Center.

-1983 - São Paulo SP - As Jóias da Senhora de Sade, at Raquel Arnaud Art Office.

-1984 - Rio de Janeiro RJ - Braids, at GB ARTe.

-1985 - São Paulo SP - Tunga: sculptures, at the Raquel Arnaud Art Office.

-1986 - Rio de Janeiro RJ - Individual, at Galeria Saramenha.

-1989 - Chicago (United States) - Option 37: Tunga, at Museum of Contemporary Art.

-1989 - London (England) - Individual, at Whitechapel Art Gallery.

-1989 - Rio de Janeiro RJ - Individual, at Galeria Paulo Klabin.

-1989 - São Paulo SP - Individual, at the Raquel Arnaud Art Office.

-1990 - Amsterdam (Netherlands) - Individual, at Pulitzer Art Gallery.

-1990 - Glasgow (Scotland) - Individual, at The Third Eye Center.

-1990 - Toronto (Canada) - Interceptions, at The Power Plant Contemporary Art Gallery.

-1991 - Rio de Janeiro RJ - Preliminaries of Palíndromo Incest, at GB ARTe.

-1991 - São Paulo SP - Preliminaries of Palíndromo Incest, at Galeria Millan.

-1992 - Rio de Janeiro RJ - Sero Te Amavi, at Galeria Saramenha.

-1992 - São Paulo SP - Antigas Minúcias, at Marília Razuk Art Gallery.

-1992 - São Paulo SP - Sero Te Amavi, at Galeria Millan.

-1994 - New York (United States) - Tunga: installations and sculptures, at The Museum of Contemporary Art.

-1994 - Rio de Janeiro RJ - Tunga: sculptures, at Galeria Paulo Fernandes.

-1994 - São Paulo SP - Individual, at Galeria Luisa Strina.

-1994 - São Paulo SP - Individual, at Galeria Millan.

-1995 - New York (United States) - Sero Te Amavi, at The New Museum of Contemporary Art.

-1996 - São Paulo SP - Individual, at Galeria André Millan.

-1996 - São Paulo SP - Individual, at Galeria Luisa Strina.

-1997 - Miami (United States) - Tunga: 1977–1997, at the Museum of Contemporary Art Joan Lehman Building.

-1997 - New York (United States) - Tunga: 1977–1997, at the Center for Curatorial Studies.

-1997 - Rio de Janeiro RJ - Tunga, at Galeria Thomas Cohn.

-1998 - Caracas (Venezuela) - Tunga: 1977–1997, at Museo Alejandro Otero.

-1999 - São Paulo SP - Individual, at Galeria Luisa Strina
.

2001 - Paris (France) - Individual, at Galerie Nationale du Jeu de Paume.

-2001 - São Paulo SP - Resgate, at CCBB
-2004 - São Paulo SP - Individual, at Galeria Millan Antonio

References

Brazilian contemporary artists
Brazilian performance artists
1952 births
2016 deaths
21st-century Brazilian artists
20th-century Brazilian painters
20th-century Brazilian male artists
20th-century Brazilian sculptors